Grove Township is a township in Taylor County, Iowa, USA.

History
Grove Township was established in 1870.

References

Townships in Taylor County, Iowa
Townships in Iowa
1870 establishments in Iowa
Populated places established in 1870